Bollmannia is a genus of gobies native to the Atlantic and Pacific coasts of the Americas. The generic name honours the American naturalist Charles Harvey Bollman (1868–1889).

Species
There are currently 11 recognized species in this genus:
 Bollmannia boqueronensis Evermann & M. C. Marsh, 1899 (White-eye goby)
 Bollmannia chlamydes D. S. Jordan, 1890
 Bollmannia communis Ginsburg, 1942 (Ragged goby)
 Bollmannia eigenmanni (Garman, 1896) (Shelf goby)
 Bollmannia gomezi Acero P., 1981 (Colombian goby)
 Bollmannia litura Ginsburg, 1935
 Bollmannia macropoma C. H. Gilbert, 1892 (Frailscale goby)
 Bollmannia marginalis Ginsburg, 1939 (Apostrophe goby)
 Bollmannia ocellata C. H. Gilbert, 1892 (Pennant goby)
 Bollmannia stigmatura C. H. Gilbert, 1892 (Tailspot goby)
 Bollmannia umbrosa Ginsburg, 1939 (Dusky goby)

References

Gobiidae
Taxa named by David Starr Jordan